Rodion Sergeyevich "Rod" Dyachenko (born 22 September 1983 in Georgiyevsk) is a retired Russian footballer who played in Vietnam for Than Quảng Ninh.

Career

Youth and college
Dyachenko was born in the Russian SFSR in the Soviet Union prior to the breakup of the country in the early 1990s. After moving with his family to the United States as a child, Dyachenko attended Mountain View High School in Vancouver, Washington, played club soccer with West Villa Thunder, FC Portland and Westside Metros and played college soccer with the University of Nevada, Las Vegas from 2002 to 2005, scoring 23 goals in those four years.

Professional
Dyachenko was selected in the third round (31st overall) in the 2006 MLS SuperDraft by D.C. United, but did not play regularly with the team in his first year in the league, He was selected in the 2006 MLS Expansion Draft by Toronto FC, but was re-acquired by D.C. in February 2007 in a trade for a first round pick in the 2008 MLS SuperDraft, after he ran into difficulty obtaining permission to work in Canada: Dyachenko holds a U.S. green card, allowing him to be counted as an American domestic player under MLS roster rules, but no passport from any country. Dyachenko was released by D.C. in January 2009 after playing 41 games and scoring one goal for the team.

On February 26, 2009, the Minnesota Thunder announced the signing of Dyachenko to a two-year contract. He played 27 games and scored 2 goals for the team in his debut season, but along with the rest of the Minnesota Thunder team had his contract terminated in December 2009.

In November 2009 Dyachenko signed to play professional indoor soccer for Baltimore Blast in the Major Indoor Soccer League during the 2009/10 USL-1 offseason.

Honors

D.C. United
 Major League Soccer Supporter's Shield: 2007
 Lamar Hunt U.S. Open Cup: 2008

References

External links
 KL SPA player profile
 Minnesota Thunder bio
 Baltimore Blast bio
 MLS player profile

1983 births
Living people
People from Georgiyevsk
Russian footballers
Russian expatriate footballers
Russian expatriate sportspeople in Malaysia
Expatriate soccer players in the United States
Baltimore Blast (2008–2014 MISL) players
D.C. United players
Major League Soccer players
Minnesota Thunder players
Real Maryland F.C. players
Russian expatriate sportspeople in the United States
UNLV Rebels men's soccer players
USL First Division players
USL Second Division players
Russian expatriate sportspeople in Thailand
Rod Dyachenko
Rod Dyachenko
D.C. United draft picks
Expatriate footballers in Thailand
Expatriate footballers in Vietnam
Expatriate footballers in Malaysia
Association football midfielders
Soccer players from Washington (state)
Sportspeople from Vancouver, Washington
Major Indoor Soccer League (2008–2014) players
Sportspeople from Stavropol Krai
Than Quang Ninh FC players
Ho Chi Minh City FC players
Can Tho FC players